
This is a timeline of German history, comprising important legal and territorial changes and political events in Germany and its predecessor states. To read about the background to these events, see History of Germany.  See also the list of German monarchs and list of chancellors of Germany and the list of years in Germany.

 Centuries: 1st3rd4th5th6th7th8th9th10th11th12th13th14th15th16th17th18th19th20th21st

BC

1st century

3rd century

4th century

5th century

6th century

7th century

8th century

9th century

10th century

11th century

12th century

13th century

14th century

15th century

16th century

17th century

18th century

19th century

20th century

21st century

See also
 :Category:Timelines of cities in Germany

References

Further reading
 Langer, William. An Encyclopedia of World History (5th ed. 1973); highly detailed outline of events online free
 Morris, Richard B. and Graham W. Irwin, eds. Harper Encyclopedia of the Modern World: A Concise Reference History from 1760 to the Present (1970) online
 
 
 
 
 
 
   In two parts: to 1657 + 1658–1914 (fulltext)

External links
 
 

Years in Germany
German